The 2020 UAE Super Cup was the 13th professional and 20th overall UAE Super Cup, an annual football match played between the winners of the previous season's Pro-League and President's Cup.

Due to the cancellation of last year's tournament as a result of the COVID-19 pandemic, the super cup was contested as a repeat between the participants of last season's league and cup winners, Sharjah and Shabab Al Ahli.

Details

References

UAE Super Cup
Shabab Al-Ahli Dubai FC
UAE Super Cup seasons